Jack Hirst (birth unknown – death unknown) was an English professional rugby league footballer who played in the 1920s and 1930s.

Background
Jack Hirst was born in Featherstone, Wakefield, West Riding of Yorkshire, England.

Playing career

International honours
Jack Hirst won a cap for England while at Featherstone Rovers in 1923 against Wales, and in doing so became Featherstone Rovers' first international player.

County honours
Jack Hirst won caps for Yorkshire while at Featherstone Rovers; during the 1924–25 season against Lancashire and Cumberland, and during the 1925–26 season against Cumberland, and Lancashire. Jack Hirst had been selected for Yorkshire during the 1922–23 season, but had to withdraw through injury.

County Cup Final appearances
Jack Hirst played right-, i.e. number 3, in Featherstone Rovers' 0–5 defeat by Leeds in the 1928 Yorkshire County Cup Final during the 1928–29 season at Belle Vue, Wakefield on Saturday 24 November 1928.

Club career
Jack Hirst made his début for Featherstone Rovers as a right-, i.e. number 3, on Saturday 27 August 1921, he played his last match for Featherstone Rovers during the 1930–31 season, he appears to have scored no drop-goals (or field-goals as they are currently known in Australasia), but prior to the 1974–75 season all goals, whether; conversions, penalties, or drop-goals, scored 2-points, consequently prior to this date drop-goals were often not explicitly documented, therefore '0' drop-goals may indicate drop-goals not recorded, rather than no drop-goals scored. In addition, prior to the 1949–50 season, the archaic field-goal was also still a valid means of scoring points.

Honoured at Featherstone Rovers
Jack Hirst is a Featherstone Rovers Hall of Fame inductee.

References

External links

England national rugby league team players
English rugby league players
Featherstone Rovers players
Place of birth missing
Place of death missing
Rugby league centres
Rugby league players from Featherstone
Year of birth missing
Year of death missing
Yorkshire rugby league team players